Mega Man V is a video game published by Capcom for the Game Boy handheld game console. It is the fifth game in the Game Boy version of the original Mega Man series. The game follows the adventures of the protagonist Mega Man as he must defend the Earth from a group of powerful robots from outer space called the Stardroids. Mega Man V is unique among the Game Boy Mega Man games as it features original bosses rather than recycling those from the Nintendo Entertainment System (NES) Mega Man games.

Mega Man V is an action platformer in which the player selects stages in a non-linear fashion and acquires the weapon of each boss defeated to use as their own. Although it plays nearly identical to other games in the series, Mega Man V features a new default weapon (the powerful "Mega Arm") and introduces Tango, a new assistant character. Mega Man V received a positive critical reception. In 2013, Mega Man V was made available on the Virtual Console of Japan's Nintendo eShop for the Nintendo 3DS. It was released in the North American and PAL region eShops the following year.

Plot
The game opens in an unspecified year in the 21st century ("20XX AD"), several months after the events of Mega Man IV and another failure by the infamous Dr. Wily to conquer the world. Mega Man and his sister Roll are strolling through a grassy field, when they are confronted by a mysterious robot who calls himself Terra. Mega Man attempts to fight Terra, only to find that his "Mega Buster" arm cannon has no effect on him. Mega Man is knocked unconscious, and powerful robots calling themselves the "Stardroids" attack Earth, defeating numerous robots, including Robot Masters from previous Mega Man games. Waking up in Dr. Light's laboratory, Mega Man is presented with the new and powerful "Mega Arm" to help him fight the Stardroids in his newest mission to save the planet.

After defeating all the Stardroids, including Terra (after he tells Mega Man he has meddled in his plans for the last time), Mega Man finds out that his archenemy Dr. Wily was ordering them to dominate Earth. Mega Man sets off to the mad scientist's new base, the Wily Star (a reference to the Death Star) to stop him. In the base, Mega Man has rematches with four foes from his previous adventures (Enker, Quint, Punk, and Ballade). Wily releases an ancient robot called Sunstar to destroy Mega Man. However, Sunstar attacks Wily instead, and then turns his attention to Mega Man. Mega Man wins the battle and tries to convince Sunstar to be repaired by Dr. Light. However, Sunstar is already too badly damaged, and minutes later he explodes, taking the Wily Star with him. Mega Man escapes using Rush. He walks through a field, pondering the recent events, when Wily makes one last, unsuccessful attack. The game ends with Mega Man chasing Wily off the screen.

Gameplay

The gameplay in Mega Man V is largely similar to other games in the Mega Man series. As the protagonist Mega Man, the player is presented with a set of action and platform-style levels to complete. Mega Man's primary weapon is his staple arm cannon. However, rather than being able to charge and fire a more powerful blast with the trademark Mega Buster, the Mega Arm is used in essentially the same manner. Charging up and releasing the firing button causes Mega Man's arm to detach, strike an enemy, and then reattach. Destroying the boss at the end of each stage adds its special weapon to Mega Man's arsenal for the rest of the game. As each boss is weak to specific weapon, the player is encouraged to complete some stages before others. These bosses are known in game as "Mercury", "Venus", "Mars", "Jupiter", "Saturn", "Uranus", "Neptune", and "Pluto", named after the first, second, fourth, and fifth through eighth planets in our Solar System. Pluto was, at the time the game was made, considered a planet, unlike from 2006 and onwards. Terra is named for the Latin word for Earth. Defeating some bosses will allow the player to access Mega Man's robot dog Rush, who can transform into useful "Coil" and "Jet" modes for easier stage navigation. Mega Man V also introduces Tango the cat, another robotic pet to help Mega Man. Like the bird Beat from previous installments in the series, Tango will appear on the screen when summoned to attack enemies, transforming into a buzzsaw and ricocheting around the room. As in Mega Man IV, the player can return to Dr. Light between stages to purchase items using "Power Chips (P-Chips)" scattered throughout the game.

Mega Man V breaks an established trend in the Mega Man games released on the Game Boy handheld. Prior to its release, games in the series on the system featured a set of four "Robot Masters" boss characters from their titular NES counterpart and a second set of four from the succeeding NES game in the series. Mega Man V instead features entirely original enemy characters with the Stardroids, who are all named after the planets in the Solar System: Neptune, Mercury, Venus, Mars, Pluto, Uranus, Jupiter, Saturn and Terra (Earth).

Development
Mega Man V was developed by the same third-party company that worked on three of the four previous Game Boy Mega Man games. According to Mega Man series artist Keiji Inafune, the fifth installment took the longest time to develop of all five of these titles. Inafune was responsible for the game's character designs after their initial concepts were devised. "When you have a theme to follow, it can make things easier and harder at the same time," Inafune recounted. "Especially with a theme as vague as space." He additionally recalled having "a lot of reservations" when designing the Stardroids. Tango was included as a support character not featured in the home console games; his name, like other characters in the series, is part of musical motif. Inafune, who always enjoyed working on animal support characters, was especially pleased to design Tango due to the artist's personal fondness for cats. Mega Man V is the final installment in the Game Boy line of games based on the original Mega Man series. Inafune stated, "In the end, I think we had a lot of fun working on this series". Mega Man V was developed with Super Game Boy support, which allows the game to be played with a custom color scheme and border on the Super Nintendo Entertainment System (SNES). It was one of the first games available with added support from the peripheral. It was also the last time the classic 8-bit Mega Man sprite was used for a game released on an 8-bit console, and last until Mega Man 9 in 2008.

Reception and legacy

Overall critical reception for Mega Man V has been positive. While many aspects of the game were commended, critics found very little change from previous installments in the series. VideoGames summarized, "If you don't have a Mega Man game for your Game Boy, this one is a good as any. It's entertaining...it's Mega Man. If you're thinking 'rehash', you might be right and it's still a pretty fun game, though." Nintendo Power was impressed by its gameplay and graphics, but felt that the game is too short, "especially when you sit down with the Super Game Boy and cruise". GamePro was contrastingly unimpressed with the controls on the SNES, considering the use of Game Boy much simpler.

In 2008, Nintendo Power listed Mega Man V as the 14th best Game Boy or Game Boy Color video game, praising it as the best of a quality series of portable Mega Man games. Game Informers Ben Reeves called it the 11th best Game Boy game due to its relative ambition compared to its Game Boy predecessors. Mega Man V was available for the similarly named Nintendo Power cartridge service in Japan on April 13, 2001 alongside its four Game Boy Mega Man predecessors. Outside Japan, the game is considered to be quite rare. All five games on the Game Boy were to be released as part of a Game Boy Advance compilation in 2004 titled Mega Man Anniversary Collection, but it was delayed indefinitely, renamed Mega Mania, and eventually cancelled. In 2011, IGN listed the game among titles they wished to see downloadable from the Nintendo eShop for Nintendo 3DS. On July 18, 2013, it was confirmed that Mega Man V is planned for release on the 3DS Virtual Console; it came out November 6, 2013 in Japan, on May 22, 2014 in North America. and August 28, 2014 in the PAL Region.

Other media
The characters and plotline for Mega Man V were incorporated into the Mega Man Gigamix comic books by Hitoshi Ariga, with the battle against the Stardroids acting as a finale.

They were also present in the Mega Man series from Archie Comics, with a full adaptation of Mega Man V being foreshadowed in various stories but not coming to pass before the series went on indefinite hiatus. The comic storyline takes unique action of linking the Stardroids with Mega Man 3s Shadow Man and Ra Moon, the primary antagonist of Super Adventure Rockman, as well as giving them a history with the alien robot Duo and Trio, his unnamed antagonist from Mega Man 8. Ra Moon's intent during Super Adventure Rockman to prepare the Earth for the arrival of its Stardroid creations; when its defeat at Mega Man's hands made this impossible, it sent a signal to the Stardroids aboard their craft, the future Wily Star. Terra appeared briefly in issue 20 of the series while Mega Man was caught up in a time travel adventure, and later during a flashback in which he sent Ra Moon to Earth under the protection of the Kuiper Droids, a group of bodyguard robots of whom Shadow Man is the last surviving member. Dr. Light later witnessed the Stardroids' future invasion in a vision experienced during issue 55, the last issue before the series went on hiatus.

References

External links

Official Rockman website 

1994 video games
Game Boy games
Mega Man games
Platform games
Action video games
Side-scrolling video games
Video games developed in Japan
Virtual Console games
Virtual Console games for Nintendo 3DS
Superhero video games
Mega Man spin-off games
Video games set in outer space
Video games set on fictional planets